Bozeman Pass el.  is a mountain pass situated approximately  east of Bozeman, Montana and approximately  west of Livingston, Montana on Interstate 90. It separates the Bridger and Gallatin mountain ranges.

It is named after pioneer John Bozeman, a young Georgian who opened the Bozeman Trail from Fort Laramie, Wyoming to Virginia City, Montana in 1863, via the pass which now bears his name.  The pass is part of a transcontinental railroad route constructed by the Northern Pacific Railway between Saint Paul, Minnesota and Tacoma, Washington. The Northern Pacific opened a  tunnel under the Pass in 1884. A shorter  tunnel just north of the original opened in 1945. The tracks are now used by Montana Rail Link and BNSF Railway.

Sacagawea, the Shoshone woman who guided parts of the Lewis and Clark Expedition (the Corps of Discovery), led Captain William Clark and his party of ten men through the pass on July 15, 1806. They were eastward bound and planned to explore the Yellowstone River to its mouth, where they were to rejoin Captain Meriwether Lewis and party, who were returning eastward via the Missouri River.,

See also
 Mountain passes in Montana

Notes

External links

 Bozeman Pass Web Cam - Regularly updates pictures of the pass.  Also has links to wind and temps.

Landforms of Gallatin County, Montana
Northern Pacific Railway
Mountain passes of Montana
Rail mountain passes of the United States